I-27 was a submarine of the Imperial Japanese Navy which saw service during the Pacific Campaign of World War II.  I-27 was commissioned at Sasebo, Japan on February 24, 1942.

Service history
On 31 May 1942, I-27 launched midget submarine M-14 as the leading submarine for the attack on Sydney, New South Wales, Australia.

On June 4, 1942,  while en route Whyalla-Newcastle was torpedoed and sunk 44 miles SSW of Gabo Island by I-27. Thirty eight of her forty two crew were lost, with the survivors being picked up by SS Mulbera.

On March 20, 1943,  was torpedoed and sunk in the Indian Ocean by I-27. The sole survivor of this sinking made no comment as to the fate of the crew, although some publications suggest that they may have been killed by the crew of I-27. There is no conclusive evidence either way, but there is also no evidence of I-27 taking such action on other occasions.

On June 3, 1943, I-27  torpedoed and sank SS Montanan in the Indian Ocean.  Five of Montanans crew were killed and 58 were rescued.

On July 5, 1943 I-27 torpedoed and sank the Alcoa Protector, sailing as part of convoy PA44 in the Gulf of Oman.
The turbine engines of this ship were later salvaged and used to propel the Great Lakes freighter Kinsman Independent.

On November 8, 1943, I-27 sank the Liberty ship SS Sambridge. The survivors made it safely to lifeboats and the ship's captain, Captain H. Scurr, was taken prisoner. A burst of machine-gun fire was heard by the survivors, but its reason is unknown as Scurr was eventually freed from Changi prison camp at the end of the war.

The submarine torpedoed and sank the Allied steamship  near the Maldives on February 12, 1944, killing 1,297 passengers and crew. After the attack, I-27 attempted to hide under Khedive Ismails survivors who were floating in the water. Ninety-nine of I-27s crew were killed. One survivor was captured by the British.

Notes

Bibliography

 
 

Type B1 submarines
Ships built by Sasebo Naval Arsenal
1940 ships
World War II submarines of Japan
Japanese submarines lost during World War II
World War II shipwrecks in the Indian Ocean
Maritime incidents in February 1944